Chrysopophthorus hungaricus is a species of wasp in the family Braconidae. It is found in North Italy. It is also found in Great Britain as an introduced species. It is a parasitoid of adult Chrysopidae (Neuroptera).

References

External links 

 Chrysopophthorus hungaricus at insectoid.info

Euphorinae
Insects described in 1927